The Route du Rhum is a single person transatlantic yacht race. The 1986 race was the 3rd edition and had seven classes with 32 boats taking part.

Results

External links
 
 Official YouTube Channel

References

Route du Rhum
1986 in sailing
Route du Rhum
Single-handed sailing competitions